Kristina Mladenovic was the defending champion, but decided not to participate.

Qualifier Ana Savić won the title, defeating second seed Monica Puig in the final, 5–7, 6–3, 6–4.

Seeds

Main draw

Finals

Top half

Bottom half

References 
 Main draw

Ankara Cup - Singles
Ankara Cup